Ressaidar  was a Viceroy's commissioned officer's (VCO) rank in the British Indian Army. Ressaidar denoted a junior commander of a risala or risalah (a body of horse, regardless if troop or regiment) in Persian.

This native Officer's rank existed in Cavalry only, there was never a corresponding position in the other arms. A Ressaidar was a junior troop commander, so he could be regarded as native junior 'Captain'. He was usually the head of the second troop of a squadron, while the first troop was led by a Risaldar, who was a native senior 'Captain'.

During the British Raj, a Ressaidar ranked above Jemadar or Naib-Risaldar (rank abolished in 1865) and below Risaldar (with the latter he was sometimes confused with, even by authors of military literature). A Ressaidar was roughly equivalent to a 'Captain, 2nd Class' or 'Captain lieutenant', but in World War I, he was classified as native 'Lieutenant'. Nevertheless, all VCO's were always outranked by the lowest british Officer with a full commission. 

The rank of Ressaidar was abolished with effect from 1st April 1921. Indian Officers then holding that rank were to be promoted to Risaldar.

References

Military ranks of British India